The Walled City of Lahore Authority is a semi-governmental organisation in Lahore, Pakistan, established and funded by the Government of Punjab for the conservation, planning and development, regulation and management of the Walled City of Lahore.

The organisation works autonomously and was established in 2012 after Provincial Assembly of the Punjab amended the Walled City of Lahore Bill 2011 to create the authority. It looks after the heritage sites in the area and specifies penalties for damaging buildings and runs the functions of the Old City of Lahore. The authority also helps promote cultural activities and tourism in Lahore.

References

External links 
 

Government agencies of Punjab, Pakistan
Walled City of Lahore
Organisations based in Lahore
2012 establishments in Pakistan
Organizations established in 2012